Weitmannsee is a lake in Swabia, Bavaria, Germany. At an elevation of 501 m, its surface area is 33 ha.

Lakes of Bavaria